GwanggyoJungang (Ajou Univ.) Station is a major metro station located in Gwanggyo, Yeongtong-gu, Suwon, Gyeonggi-do, South Korea. Jungang means "center" in Korean, denoting the station's central location in Gwanggyo. The station is close to Ajou University and its hospital.

Forming the downtown of Gwanggyo new city, the Gyeonggi Provincial Office is scheduled to be built here and it is directly surrounded by many large shopping malls such as Avenue France and World Square, a Lotte outlet and cinema and the popular Gwanggyo lake park and cafe street.

The station is the country's first subway station to have an underground bus transfer station which was planned to open in early March 2016, where screen doors are installed on bus platforms so bus riders from all over Suwon can transfer to the subway directly by walking down only one floor.

References

Seoul Metropolitan Subway stations
Metro stations in Yongin
Railway stations opened in 2016